Redi Jupi (born 31 May 1974) is an Albanian retired footballer.  He played in the central midfield for KS Dinamo Tirana and has 19 caps for the Albania national team since his debut in 1995. Jupi is currently the manager of Albania U21 for the European Football Championship qualification.

Playing career

Club
Jupi appeared in 128 Turkish Super Lig matches during the three seasons he played for Diyarbakirspor.

International
He made his debut for Albania in an August 1995 friendly match away against Malta and earned a total of 19 caps, scoring no goals. His final international was a March 2006 friendly match against Georgia in Tirana.

National team statistics

Managerial career
On 11 August 2015, Jupi was appointed manager of the Albania U21 following the departure of Skënder Gega at Kuwaiti Premier League side Al-Jahra. His debut was a 1–1 home draw against Israel U21 in team's second qualifying match for 2017 UEFA European Under-21 Football Championship. After the match, he told the media that he was satisfied with the team's reaction.

Albanian FA
The Albanian Football Association president Armand Duka created the 'Talent Office' in 2011 and named Jupi as the head of the new department to scout young Albanian talent all around the world and convince them to represent Albania. 
From 2012 onward he was appointed as the Director of the National Teams Department in the AFA.

Honours
Albanian Superliga: 2
 2002, 2003

References

External links
 
 Albania - Record International Players - RSSSF

1974 births
Living people
Footballers from Vlorë
Albanian footballers
Association football midfielders
Albania international footballers
FK Dinamo Tirana players
KF Olimpik Tirana players
FK Partizani Tirana players
NK Istra players
HNK Rijeka players
NK Slavija Vevče players
KF Tirana players
Diyarbakırspor footballers
Albanian expatriate footballers
Expatriate footballers in Croatia
Albanian expatriate sportspeople in Croatia
Expatriate footballers in Slovenia
Albanian expatriate sportspeople in Slovenia
Expatriate footballers in Turkey
Albanian expatriate sportspeople in Turkey
Croatian Football League players
Süper Lig players
Albanian football managers
FK Dinamo Tirana managers
Albania national under-21 football team managers